The Metropolitan Cathedral of San José  is a cathedral in San José, Costa Rica, located on Calle Central and Avenues 2 and 4. The original cathedral was built in 1802 but was destroyed by an earthquake.

References

Cathedrals in Costa Rica
Buildings and structures in San José, Costa Rica
Tourist attractions in San José, Costa Rica
Roman Catholic cathedrals in Costa Rica
19th-century Roman Catholic church buildings in Costa Rica